Stiebel is a surname. Notable people with the surname include: 

Joan V. Stiebel (1911–2007), Jewish relief worker in London
Penelope Hunter-Stiebel (born 1946), American art curator and historian
Victor Stiebel (1907–1976), South African-born British couturier

See also
Stiebel Eltron, German heating products company